Dinophyceae is a class of dinoflagellates.

Taxonomy
 Class Dinophyceae Pascher 1914 [Peridinea Ehrenberg 1830 stat. nov. Wettstein; Blastodiniphyceae Fensome et al. 1993 orthog. emend.]
 Order Haplozoonales [Haplozooidea Poche 1913]
 Family Haplozoonaceae Chatton 1920
 Order Akashiwales 
 Family Akashiwaceae 
 Order Blastodiniales Chatton 1906 [Blastodinida Chatton 1906]
 Family Blastodiniaceae Cavers 1913
 Order Apodiniales 
 Family Apodiniaceae Chatton 1920 
 Order Dinotrichales Pascher 1914
 Family Crypthecodiniaceae Biecheler 1938 ex Chatton 1952
 Family Dinotrichaceae Pascher 1914
 Order Phytodiniales T. Christ. 1962 ex Loeblich 1970 [Dinococcales Pascher 1914; Suessiales Fensome & al. 1993; Dinamoebales] 
 Family †Suessiaceae Fensome et al. 1993
 Family Phytodiniaceae Klebs 1912 [Dinococcaceae Fott 1960; Hemidiniaceae Bourrelly 1970; Borghiellaceae Moestrup, Lindberg & Daugbjerg 2009]
 Family Symbiodiniaceae Fensome & al. 1993 [Zooxanthellaceae]
 Order Brachidiniales Loeblich III 1982 ex Sournia 1984
 Family Brachidiniaceae Sournia 1972 [Kareniaceae Bergholtz & al. 2006] 
 Order Ptychodiscales Fensome & al. 1993
 Family Ptychodiscaceae Lemmermann 1899
 Order Amphilothales Lindemann 1928
 Family Amphitholaceae Poche 1913 [Amphilothaceae] 
 Order Actiniscales [Actiniscineae (Sournia 1984) Fensome et al. 1993b]
 Family Actiniscaceae Kützing 1844 [Gymnasteraceae Lindemann 1928]
 Family Dicroerismaceae Fensome & al. 1993
 Order Gymnodiniales Lemmermann 1910
 Cochlodinium group
 Gyrodinium dorsum group
 Gyrodinium group
 Togula group
 Family Chytriodiniaceae Cachon & Cachon-Enjumet 1968
 Family Gymnodiniaceae (Bergh 1881a) Lankester 1885 [Polykrikaceae Kofoid & Swezy 1921]
 Family Warnowiaceae Lindemann 1928
 Order Prorocentrales Lemmermann 1910 
 Family Haplodiniaceae Lindemann 1928
 Family Prorocentraceae Stein 1883
 Order †Nannoceratopsiales Piel & Evitt 1980
 Family †Nannoceratopsiaceae Gocht 1970
 Order Dinophysales Lindemann 1928
 Family Amphisoleniaceae Lindemann 1928
 Family Dinophysaceae Stein 1883 [Citharistaceae Kofoid & Skogsberg 1928; Ornithocercaceae Kofoid & Skogsberg 1928]
 Family Oxyphysaceae Sournia 1984
 Order Gonyaulacales Taylor 1980 [Pyrocystales Apstein 1909] 
 Family †Lotharingiaceae 
 Family †Mancodiniaceae 
 Family †Pareodiniaceae 
 Family †Scriniocassiaceae 
 Amylax group
 Family Ceratiaceae Kofoid 1907
 Family Goniodomataceae Lindemann 1928 [Ostreopsidaceae Lindemann 1928, Triadiniaceae Dodge 1981; Yeseviidae Özdikmen 2009, Centrodiniaceae Hernández-Becerril et al. 2010]
 Family Gonyaulacaceae Lindemann 192
 Family Protoceratidaceae Lindemann 1928 [Ceratocorythaceae Lindemann 1928]
 Family Pyrocystaceae (Schütt 1896) Lemmermann 1899 [Pyrophacaceae Lindemann 1928; Helgolandinioideae]
 Family Thecadiniaceae Balech 1956
 Order Thoracosphaerales Tangen 1982 [?Lophodiniales Dodge 1984]
 Family Calciodinellaceae [Calciodinelloideae Deflandre 1947]
 Family Glenodiniaceae Wiley & Hickson 1909 [Glenodiniopsidaceae Schiller 1935; Dinosphaeraceae Lindemann 1928; Lophodiniaceae Osorio-Tafall 1942; Glenodiniineae Fensome et al. 1993b]
 Family Thoracosphaeraceae Schiller 1930 [Oodiniaceae Chatton 1920; Protoodinidae; Protoodiniaceae Cachon 1964; Hemidiniaceae Bourrelly 1970; Cachonellaceae Silva 1980; Stylodiniaceae Pascher ex Sournia 1984; Pfiesteriaceae Steidinger & al. 1996)]
 Order Peridiniales Haeckel 1894 
 Family †Comparodiniaceae Vozzhennikova 1979
 Family †Stephanelytraceae Stover et al. 1977
 Family †Dollidiniaceae Fensome et al. 1993
 Amphidoma caudata group
 Ensiculifera group
 Family Amphidiniopsidaceae Dodge 1984
 Family Amphidomataceae Sournia 1984
 Family Cladopyxidaceae Stein 1883 [Cladopyxididae Poche 1913]
 Family Diplopsaliaceae Matsuoka 1988 [Diplopsaloideae]
 Family Endodiniaceae Schiller 1935
 Family Heterocapsaceae Fensome et al. 1993 [Heterocapsineae Fensome et al. 1993]
 Family Heterodiniaceae Lindemann 1928
 Family Oxytoxaceae Lindemann 1928
 Family Peridiniaceae
 Family Podolampadaceae Lindemann 1928 [Lessardiaceae Carbonell-Moore 2004]
 Family Protoperidiniaceae Balech 1988 [Kolkwitziellaceae Lindemann 1928; Congruentidiaceae Schiller 1935; Protoperidiniaceae Bujak & Davies 1998]

References

 
Dinoflagellate classes